Jacques Léonard (born December 2, 1936) is a Canadian accountant, educator, and politician in the province of Quebec. He served in the National Assembly of Quebec from 1976 to 1985 and again from 1989 to 2001 and was a cabinet minister in the governments of René Lévesque, Jacques Parizeau, and Lucien Bouchard. Léonard is a Quebec sovereigntist and a member of the Parti Québécois (PQ) and Bloc Québécois (BQ).

Early life and career
Léonard was born in Saint-Jovite, in the Laurentides region of Quebec. He received a diploma in accountancy in 1959 and a master's degree in commercial sciences from the Université Laval in 1962. After working for two years in the Montreal firm of Clarkson and Gordon, he continued his studies in Paris, France, from 1964 to 1966. Léonard taught at the École des hautes études commerciales and the Université national du Rwanda from 1966 to 1968, at which time he returned to Quebec. From 1968 to 1976, he was a professor and vice-dean of education at the Université de Montréal.

Léonard became a member of the sovereigntist Rassemblement pour l'Indépendance Nationale in 1962 and joined the Parti Québécois after the former party wound down in 1968. He ran unsuccessfully as a PQ candidate in Labelle in the 1970 and 1973 provincial elections. The PQ won a historic majority government in the 1976 provincial election, and Léonard was elected on his third attempt in Labelle over one-term Liberal incumbent Roger Lapointe.

Legislator (1976–85)

Cabinet minister (1976–84)
Planning
Léonard was named to René Lévesque's first cabinet on November 26, 1976, as the minister of state responsible for planning. This was intended as one of five "superministry" portfolios in the cabinet; Léonard was entrusted with working on long-term strategy for land use rather than having the day-to-day administrative duties of a department. On March 2, 1978, he was also named as vice-president of the treasury board.

In May 1979, Léonard was a signatory to a deal that saw the governments of Quebec and Canada invest one hundred and fifty million dollars in Quebec's pulp and paper industry.
Municipal affairs
Léonard was reassigned as municipal affairs minister on November 6, 1980, exchanging portfolios with Guy Tardif. Shortly after his appointment, he ordered the municipal government of Aylmer to focus on basic administration after receiving a troubling audit of the city's finances.

In 1981, a representative of Montreal's municipal government requested that the Lévesque government impose a freeze on the construction of shopping centres, arguing that they often destroy traditional city centres. Léonard responded that he was reluctant to intervene, particularly as municipalities already had the power to impose a freeze themselves.

Léonard was re-elected in the 1981 general election, in which the Lévesque government was returned with a second consecutive majority, and was kept in the municipal affairs portfolio. He sought to restructure Montreal's municipal government in 1982, giving the smaller suburban communities more power in relation to the city. He faced opposition to this measure from long-standing Montreal mayor Jean Drapeau, whose power was threatened by the reform.

In 1983, Léonard attempted to pass legislation permitting the Quebec government to withhold funds from municipalities that accept federal money for job creation purposes. This bill was blocked in the legislature in December 1983, after the opposition Liberal Party threatened a filibuster. The Union des Municipalités du Québec also strongly opposed the measure, and discussions between the two levels of government reached an impasse in early 1984. After Léonard was moved to a different portfolio, the Lévesque government abandoned the legislation.
Transport
Léonard was shifted to the position of transport minister on March 5, 1984. Two months later, he said that the Quebec government would not make a bid for Nordair (which was then being sold by the federal government) but would oppose any deal under which the company would leave the province.

Opposition member (1984–85)
In late 1984, the Parti Québécois went through an internal crisis over Premier Lévesque's intention to de-emphasize Quebec sovereignty in the next provincial election. Léonard sided with the hardline indépendantiste wing of the party and resigned from cabinet on November 22. Five days later, he left the PQ caucus to sit as an independent member of the assembly. From the opposition benches, he demanded that Lévesque not make any constitutional agreement with Canadian prime minister Brian Mulroney that would result in a weakening of Quebec's Charter of the French Language.

In early 1985, Léonard joined an informal grouping of former PQ MNAs centered around the newly formed Rassemblement démocratique pour l'indépendance. He resigned his seat on May 23, 1985, to become dean of the faculty of education at the Université de Montréal, a position he held until his return to politics in 1989.

Legislator (1989–2001)

Opposition member (1989–94)
Léonard returned to the Parti Québécois after Jacques Parizeau, a fellow indépendantiste and former cabinet colleague, became party leader in 1988. He was re-elected to the Quebec legislature in the 1989 provincial election over Liberal incumbent Damien Hétu, who had been elected in Labelle in 1985. The Liberals won a majority government provincially under Robert Bourassa's leadership, and Léonard re-entered the legislature as a member of the official opposition. For the next five years, he served as his party's finance critic. In 1993, he accused the Bourassa government of taking a laissez-faire approach to the economy and of having no overall vision.

Cabinet minister (1994–2001)
Transport minister
The Parti Québécois won a majority government under Parizeau's leadership in the 1994 general election. Léonard was re-elected to the legislature and rejoined cabinet on September 26, 1994, as minister of transport, ironically the same position he had resigned from ten years earlier. He was also appointed to a second term as vice-president of the treasury board.

After his appointment, Léonard argued that highways are an exclusively provincial jurisdiction and tried to postpone the government of Canada's planned national highway program. He announced increased penalties for persons driving under the influence of alcohol in 1995 and introduced legislation to require photographs on Quebec driving licenses. He also expressed scepticism about mandatory helmet laws for cyclists, saying that safety education was a better approach.

In early 1995, Léonard and industry minister Daniel Paillé announced a proposal to save the financially troubled MIL Davie Inc. shipyard with a ferry construction contract. Later in the year, he announced that the Parizeau government had no choice but to drop the plan on the grounds it had become too expensive and complex. Following protests from the shipyard workers, the government reversed itself a second time and agreed to a modified sixty-six million dollar construction program over two years.
Treasury Board president
Parizeau announced his resignation as premier after the sovereignty option's narrow defeat in the 1995 Quebec referendum. On November 3, 1995, while still leading a caretaker administration, he shuffled his cabinet and named Léonard as president of the treasury board and minister responsible for administration and the public service. In the following months, Parizeau, Léonard, and finance minister Pauline Marois worked in committee reviewing government expenses and revenues in a bid to reduce public spending.

Léonard was kept in the treasury board portfolio when Lucien Bouchard succeeded Parizeau as premier on January 29, 1996. He was also named to the priorities committee, an "inner cabinet" with significant control over the government's direction, and was named as minister responsible for the Laurentides. Over the next two years, he played a central role in the Bouchard government's ultimately successful effort to eliminate the provincial deficit.

He announced several austerity measures in March 1996, making significant spending cuts in areas such as health, education, and social assistance; the total cuts for the fiscal year amounted to $2.2 billion. In announcing these measures, Léonard said, "We have fallen behind other Canadian provinces in cleaning up public finances. Quebec must act now." He also expressed scepticism about proposed pay equity legislation later in 1996, arguing that it would put a strain on public-sector spending.

In late 1996, Léonard announced that the Bouchard government would try to achieve $1.4 billion in savings from Quebec's public-sector unions, to be achieved by unfreezing pension reserve funds rather than by taking measures that would result in significant job losses. The unions responded with a plan that focused on early retirement and employee buyouts. Negotiations continued into 1997.

Léonard introduced more severe funding cuts, amounting to $2.3 billion, in March 1997. At the same time, however, he noted that the Quebec's financial situation was improving and that no comparable cuts would be needed in the future. He also argued that the Bouchard government's austerity plan would benefit Quebec sovereignty in the long term, saying "once Quebec is much more financially solid, Quebecers will look at the future with much more confidence in themselves and their state." Ultimately, an unexpectedly high rate of voluntary retirement in the public sector allowed the government to reach its goals without difficulty. Léonard announced further cuts of one billion dollars in 1998 and noted that the province would be out of debt the following year.

Re-elected in the 1998 general election, Léonard was kept in the treasury board portfolio in Bouchard's post-election cabinet shuffle. In January 1999, he began a new round of negotiations with public-sector workers on collective agreements. After protracted discussions, the two sides agreed on a nine per cent wage increase over four years.

After years of cutbacks, Léonard projected a $1.1 billion budget surplus in March 1999 and announced new public spending in areas such as health, education, and information technology. He also introduced new hiring in the public service, with a particular focus on minority communities. The same financial trend continued the following year, and Léonard introduced more new program funding in 2000.

Lucien Bouchard resigned as premier on March 8, 2001, and was succeeded by Bernard Landry. Léonard used the occasion to announce his own resignation from both cabinet and the legislature, saying "You are witnessing a changing of the guard. My decision will allow one more young person to be promoted to cabinet." He returned to accountancy work and, in 2002, became a professor of political science at the Université du Québec à Montréal. He joined the board of governors of the Conseil de la Souveraineté du Québec in early 2003.

Federal politics
In 2003–04, Léonard led a Bloc Québécois review of Canadian federal spending practices. He concluded that there had been sharp increases in some areas, including opinion polls, office furniture, and the office of the privacy commissioner of Canada.

Léonard ran as a Bloc Québécois candidate in the Montreal division of Outremont in the 2006 federal election and finished a close second against incumbent Liberal cabinet minister Jean Lapierre. Léonard later served as the Bloc's vice-president and worked on the party's campaign in the 2008 federal election.

Electoral record
Federal

Sources: Official Results, Elections Canada and Financial Returns, Elections Canada.

Provincial

Source: Official Results, Le Directeur général des élections du Québec.

Source: Official Results, Le Directeur général des élections du Québec.

Source: Official Results, Le Directeur général des élections du Québec.

Source: Official Results, Le Directeur général des élections du Québec.

Source: Official Results, Le Directeur général des élections du Québec.

Source: Official Results, Le Directeur général des élections du Québec.

Source: Official Results, Le Directeur général des élections du Québec.

References

1936 births
Living people
Parti Québécois MNAs
Bloc Québécois candidates for the Canadian House of Commons
Candidates in the 2006 Canadian federal election
Academic staff of the Université de Montréal
Université Laval alumni